Nejc Vidmar (born 31 March 1989) is a Slovenian professional footballer who plays as a goalkeeper for Slovenian PrvaLiga side Mura.

Club career
Vidmar started his senior career with Domžale.

International career
Vidmar received his first call-up to the senior Slovenia squad for the UEFA Euro 2016 play-off against Ukraine in November 2015.

Honours
Domžale
Slovenian Cup: 2010–11
Slovenian Supercup: 2011

Olimpija Ljubljana
Slovenian PrvaLiga: 2015–16, 2017–18
Slovenian Cup: 2017–18, 2018–19, 2020–21

References

External links
 Player profile at NZS 
 

1989 births
Living people
Footballers from Ljubljana
Slovenian footballers
Association football goalkeepers
NK Domžale players
NK Olimpija Ljubljana (2005) players
Ionikos F.C. players
NŠ Mura players
Slovenian PrvaLiga players
Super League Greece players
Slovenian expatriate footballers
Slovenian expatriate sportspeople in Greece
Expatriate footballers in Greece
Slovenia youth international footballers
Slovenia under-21 international footballers